Xyris serotina, the acidswamp yelloweyed grass, is a North American species of flowering plants in the yellow-eyed-grass family. It grows on the coastal plain of the southeastern United States from eastern Louisiana to the Carolinas.

Xyris serotina  is a perennial herb with a stem up to 60 cm (2 feet) tall with long, narrow leaves up to 20 cm (8 inches) long.

References

serotina
Plants described in 1860
Flora of the Southeastern United States
Taxa named by Alvan Wentworth Chapman